= Edgard Blochet =

French orientalist, translator and bibliographer

Edgard Blochet (Persian: بلوشه،ادگار) (December 12, 1870 – September 51, 1937) was a French orientalist, translator, bibliographer, art historian, specializing in particular in the history of religions. He was born in Bourges. He graduated in Arabic from the School of Oriental Languages in Paris, then from the École Pratique des Hautes Études where he became an assistant between 1895 and 1901, while part of the manuscripts department of the National Library of France, where he was appointed vice-librarian in 1895. He published a great deal of work on Byzantine, Arabic, and Mongol history, but his specialty was Persian art and religious history. He became the assistant curator in 1929, then curator. He retired in November 1935.

== Sources ==
- Francis Richard, «BLOCHET (Gabriel Joseph) Edgard», in: Encyclopædia Iranica, Vol. IV, Fasc. 3, pp. 313–314. Published in December 15, 1989 (article de Francis Richard, lire en ligne).

=== See also ===
- Edgard Blochet (born 1870), French art historian, bibliographer, translator into French of selections Encyclopædia Iranica (iranicaonline.org).
- (en) K. A. C. Creswell, A Bibliography of the Architecture, Arts and Crafts of Islam.
